Tuvalu competed at the 2017 Asian Indoor and Martial Arts Games held in Ashgabat, Turkmenistan from September 17 to 27. Tuvalu sent a delegation consisting of 8 competitors for the event competing in 4 different sports. Tuvaluan team couldn't receive any medal in the competition.

Tuvalu along with other Oceania nations competed in the Asian Indoor and Martial Arts Games for the first time in history.

Participants

References 

Nations at the 2017 Asian Indoor and Martial Arts Games
2017 in Tuvaluan sport